Lenovo A6000 is an Android smartphone manufactured by Lenovo.

Features 
 Rear Camera: 8.0 MP
 Front Camera: 1.3 MP (2 MP for "plus" variant)
 Memory: 1 GB RAM (2 GB RAM for "plus" variant)
 Storage: 8 GB (16 GB for "plus" variant)
 Battery: Lithium-ion Polymer 2300 mAh
 Size: 5 Inch
 Operating System: Android 4.4.4 Kitkat, upgradable to Android 5.0.2 lollipop
 Weight: 128 g
 IPS capacitive touchscreen
 CPU:  Quad-core 1.2 GHz Cortex-A53
 Chipset:  Qualcomm MSM8916 Snapdragon 410
 GPU:  Adreno 306
 WLAN:  Wi-Fi 802.11 b/g/n, hotspot
 Bluetooth:  v4.0, A2DP
 USB:  microUSB v2.0
 Sensors:   Accelerometer, proximity
 OTG : NO
 External storage: up to 32 GB

References

Lenovo A6000 Specifications

External links
 Lenovo A6000
 Lenovo A7000

Smartphones
Android (operating system) devices
Mobile phones introduced in 2015
Discontinued smartphones
Mobile phones with user-replaceable battery